The Billboard Hot 100 is a chart that ranks the best-performing singles of the United States. Its data, published by Billboard magazine and compiled by Nielsen SoundScan, is based collectively on each single's weekly physical and digital sales, as well as airplay and streaming. At the end of a year, Billboard will publish an annual list of the 100 most successful songs throughout that year on the Hot 100 chart based on the information. For 2016, the list was published on December 8, calculated with data from December 5, 2015 to November 26, 2016. The 2016 list was dominated by Justin Bieber and Drake, who shared the top four spots, marking the first time two artists took up the top four spots since 2009 with Lady Gaga and The Black Eyed Peas.

The list is also notable for being one of five Billboard Year-End lists that featured 14 songs that appeared in the previous year (in this case 2015's) repeat onto to this list. The highest being Adele's "Hello", which with only three weeks being available to count in 2015's chart year, made it on to 2015's list at number 35 and repeat higher at number 8 in 2016's. Only four more year-end list would repeat the same feat, that being 1997, 2010, 2018 and 2022.
  
For the first time in 10 years, the year-end number-one single was #1 for five weeks or fewer.

Year-end list

See also 
 2016 in American music
 List of Billboard Hot 100 number-one singles of 2016
 List of Billboard Hot 100 top-ten singles in 2016

Notes

References 

United States Hot 100 Year-End
Billboard charts